Ooni Ademilu was the 27th Ooni of Ife, a paramount traditional ruler of Ile Ife, the ancestral home of the Yorubas. He succeeded Ooni Larunnka and was succeeded by  
Ooni Omogbogbo.

References

Oonis of Ife
Yoruba history